Beyond the Cities is a 1930 British drama film directed by Carlyle Blackwell and starring Blackwell, Edna Best and Alexander Field. The film was made as a quota quickie for release by Paramount Pictures, and is believed to have been made at Twickenham Studios. The film is mainly set in Canada.

It is also known by the alternative title of Reparations.

Cast
 Carlyle Blackwell as Jim Campbell  
 Edna Best as Mary Hayes  
 Alexander Field as Sam  
 Laurence Hanray as Gregory Hayes 
 Helen Haye as Amy Hayes  
 Eric Maturin as Hector Braydon  
 Percy Parsons as Boss

References

Bibliography
Chibnall, Steve. Quota Quickies: The Birth of the British 'B' Film. British Film Institute, 2007.
Low, Rachael. Filmmaking in 1930s Britain. George Allen & Unwin, 1985.
Wood, Linda. British Films, 1927–1939. British Film Institute, 1986.

External links
 

1930 films
1930 drama films
1930s English-language films
British drama films
Films set in Canada
Films shot at Twickenham Film Studios
Films directed by Carlyle Blackwell
British black-and-white films
Quota quickies
Paramount Pictures films
1930s British films